Vila Clotilde is a village in Caué District on São Tomé Island in São Tomé and Príncipe. Its population is 53 (2012 census). Vila Clotilde lies 6.5 km west of São João dos Angolares. 3 km to its west is Pico Cão Grande, an iconic needle-shaped volcanic plug.

Population history

References

Populated places in Caué District